Heroic is a 2023 thriller drama film directed, written and produced by David Zonana. It stars Santiago Sandoval Carbajal.

Premise
Luis, an Indigenous 18-year-old boy, encounters an institutionally violent system inside the Heroic Military College, which he enters in hope of a better future.

Cast
Santiago Sandoval Carbajal as Luis
Esteban Caicedo
Fernando Cuautle
Mónica del Carmen
Carlos Gerardo García
Isabel Yudice

Release
Heroic had its world premiere at the 2023 Sundance Film Festival on 21 January 2023. It was also screened in the Panorama section at the 73rd Berlin International Film Festival in February 2023.

Prior to its release, Wild Bunch acquired its distribution rights.

Reception

References

External links

2020s Spanish-language films
Nahuatl-language films
2023 thriller films
2023 drama films